Harold Jones (22 May 1933 – 6 September 2003) was an English footballer who played as an inside forward in the Football League for Liverpool.

References

External links
 LFC History profile

1933 births
2003 deaths
Footballers from Liverpool
English footballers
Association football defenders
Liverpool F.C. players
Rhyl F.C. players
English Football League players